Lambda Sigma Gamma Sorority, Incorporated was founded on the campus of the Alpha chapter, California State University, Sacramento, in 1986.

History
Lambda Sigma Gamma Sorority became a reality on October 24, 1986, when twenty-seven women sharing the same interest, beliefs, and goals came together. Since then, 25 additional chapters have joined, with the most recent chapters at California State University, East Bay and Notre Dame de Namur University in 2015. Lambda Sigma Gamma was officially incorporated and recognized as a service-based, nonprofit corporation by the State of Delaware on April 3, 1998. Subsequently, their sisterhood is also known as Lambda Sigma Gamma Sorority, Incorporated.

Lambda Sigma Gamma is a member of the National Multicultural Greek Council (NMGC).

The national membership is estimated at 2,100 as of July 1, 2012.

Chapters
The chapter list of Lambda Sigma Gamma. Active chapters are noted in bold, inactive chapters noted in italics.

Notable Sisters

Founder:
Linda V. Fuentes

National Presidents

2022-Present:
Kathryn Penunuri,
Member Since: Spring 2018

2020–2022:
Nayeli Galan Calito,
Member Since: Fall 2014

2017-2020:
Keosha A Griffiths,
Member Since: Fall 2009

2015–2017
Elva C Peña,
Member Since: Fall 2008

2013–2015:
Mayra Estrada
Member Since: Fall 2006

2012–2013:
Katia Pena,
Member Since: Fall 1996

2011–2012:
LaToya Marie Jackson,
Member Since: Fall 2002

2010–2011:
Cheli Cuevas-Resendiz,
Member Since: Spring 2003

2009–2010:
Alea Newman,
Member Since: 2005

2008–2009:
Danielle Munoz,
Member Since: Fall 2002

2006–2008:
Nichole Gutierrez,
Member Since: Winter 1999

2003–2006:
Katia Pena,
Member Since: Fall 1996

2002–2003:
Brenda Rodriguez Sandler,
Member Since: Winter 1997

2000–2002:
Candida Diaz,
Member Since: Winter 1995

1999–2000:
Arleen Lemus,
Member Since: Winter 1997

1998–1999:
Linda V. Fuentes,
Member Since: Fall 1986

1997–1998:
Claudia Palos,
Member Since: Spring 1992

References

External links 
 Lambda Sigma Gamma Sorority, Incorporated National Website
 California Head Start program

Student organizations established in 1986
Fraternities and sororities in the United States
National Multicultural Greek Council
1986 establishments in California